Hyperolius gularis is a species of frogs in the family Hyperoliidae.

It is endemic to Angola.
Its natural habitats are rivers, freshwater marshes, and intermittent freshwater marshes. Its taxonomic validity is not certain: It may be a synonym of Hyperolius marmoratus, the marbled reed frog.

References

gularis
Endemic fauna of Angola
Frogs of Africa
Amphibians described in 1931
Taxonomy articles created by Polbot